This is a list of the National Register of Historic Places listings in Lampasas County, Texas.

This is intended to be a complete list of properties and districts listed on the National Register of Historic Places in Lampasas County, Texas. There are one district and five individual properties listed on the National Register in the county. The district contains two individually listed properties both of which are Recorded Texas Historic Landmarks including one that is also a State Antiquities Landmark. A separate property is also a Recorded Texas Historic Landmark.

Current listings

The locations of National Register properties and districts may be seen in a mapping service provided.

|}

See also

National Register of Historic Places listings in Texas
Recorded Texas Historic Landmarks in Lampasas County

References

External links

Lampasas County, Texas
Lampasas County
Buildings and structures in Lampasas County, Texas